HPP may refer to:

Medicine
 Allopurinol, a medication
 Hereditary pyropoikilocytosis, a blood disorder
 HPP epoxidase, an enzyme
 Hypokalemic periodic paralysis, a muscle disease
 Hypophosphatasia, a bone disease

Other uses
 Hardy-Pomeau-Pazzis model, in computational fluid dynamics
 Harrington Park Press, an American publisher
 Harris Performance Products, a British motorcycle racing/parts manufacturer
 Hawaiian Paradise Park, a community on the island of Hawaii
 Head Phones President, a Japanese metal band
 Health Partners Plans, a health insurance network
 High Performance Programme, in cricket
 High pressure processing of food
 Holme Pierrepont National Watersports Centre, in England
 Human Proteome Project
 Hydroelectric power plant
 Hydrometallurgy Pilot Plant, in Egypt
 C++ Header file
 Headturn Preference Procedure, in statistical language acquisition
 Honda Power Port, a type of two-stroke power valve system
 Handan East railway station, China Railway telegraph code HPP
 Hosted Payment Page (also known as Hosted Checkout), used in ecommerce for secure checkouts.
 HTTP parameter pollution